Neottia borealis (syn. Listera borealis), the northern twayblade, is a species of terrestrial orchid found in North America. It is widespread across much of Canada, including the three Arctic territories, and also occurs in the mountains of the western United States from Alaska to northern New Mexico.

References

borealis
Plants described in 1893
Orchids of North America
Flora of Canada
Flora of Alaska
Flora of the Rocky Mountains
Flora without expected TNC conservation status